Ateshun-e Namju (also Romanized as Āteshūn-e Nāmjū) is a village in Ganjabad Rural District, Esmaili District, Anbarabad County, Kerman Province, Iran. At the 2006 census, its population was 26, in 5 families.

References 

Populated places in Anbarabad County